Saulia Airport  is an airstrip serving  Saulia, a village in the Maniema Province of the Democratic Republic of the Congo.

See also

Transport in the Democratic Republic of the Congo
List of airports in the Democratic Republic of the Congo

References

External links
OpenStreetMap - Saulia
OurAirports - Saulia
FallingRain - Saulia Airport

Airports in Maniema